The Lawless Eighties is a 1957 American Western film directed by Joseph Kane and written by Kenneth Gamet. The film stars Buster Crabbe, John Smith, Marilyn Saris, Ted de Corsia, Anthony Caruso and John Doucette. The film was released on May 31, 1957, by Republic Pictures.

Plot

Cast
Buster Crabbe as Linc Prescott
John Smith as William Wesley Van Orsdel
Marilyn Saris as Lynn Sutter
Ted de Corsia as  Bandas
Anthony Caruso as Wolf Chief
John Doucette as Art 'Pig' Corbin
Frank Ferguson as Owen Sutter
Sheila Bromley as Mrs. Myra Sutter
Walter Reed as Capt. Ellis North
Robert 'Buzz' Henry as Little Wolf
Will J. White as Lt. Reed
Robert Swan as Pete Loman

References

External links 
 

1957 films
American Western (genre) films
1957 Western (genre) films
Republic Pictures films
Films directed by Joseph Kane
1950s English-language films
1950s American films